The 2018–19 Albany Great Danes women's basketball team represents the University at Albany, SUNY during the 2018–19 NCAA Division I women's basketball season. The Great Danes, led by first year head coach Colleen Mullen, play their home games at SEFCU Arena and were members of the America East Conference. They finished the season 13–18, 9–7 in America East play to finish in fourth place. They defeated Binghamton in the quarterfinals before losing to Maine in the semifinals of the America East women's tournament.

Bernabei-McNamee left Albany on April 10 after two seasons for Boston College. On May 14, former Army assistant head coach Colleen Mullen was named the new head coach for the Great Danes.

Media
All home games and conference road games will stream on either ESPN3 on AmericaEast.tv. Most road games will stream on the opponents website. Selected games will be broadcast on the radio on WCDB.

Roster

Schedule

|-
!colspan=9 style=| Non-conference regular season

|-
!colspan=9 style=| America East regular season

|-
!colspan=9 style=| America East Women's Tournament

Rankings
2018–19 NCAA Division I women's basketball rankings

See also
 2018–19 Albany Great Danes men's basketball team

References

Albany Great Danes women's basketball seasons
Albany Great Danes
Albany
Albany Great Danes